The following lists events that happened during 1914 in New Zealand.

New Zealand showed no hesitation in emulating Britain's declaration of war on Germany and entering World War I.  New Zealand troops became the first to occupy German territory when they took over Samoa in November.

Incumbents

Regal and viceregal
 Head of State – George V
 Governor – Arthur Foljambe, 2nd Earl of Liverpool

Government
The 18th New Zealand Parliament concludes, and the Reform Party is returned for its second term of office following the 1914 general election on 10 December.

 Speaker of the House – Frederic Lang (Reform Party)
 Prime Minister – William Massey
 Minister of Finance – James Allen

Parliamentary opposition
 Leader of the Opposition – Joseph Ward (Liberal Party).

Judiciary
 Chief Justice – Sir Robert Stout

Main centre leaders
 Mayor of Auckland – James Parr
 Mayor of Wellington – John Luke
 Mayor of Christchurch – Henry Holland
 Mayor of Dunedin – William Downie Stewart Jr, then John Shacklock

Events 
 17 January – Joseph Hammond is the first person to fly over Auckland city. He flies a Blériot monoplane (named Brittania) which has been donated to the New Zealand Government by the Imperial Air Fleet Committee, from Potter's Park (near One Tree Hill).
 20 February – James William Humphrys Scotland makes the first substantial cross-country flight in New Zealand. He continues on to Dunedin, Timaru and Christchurch where he arrives on 6 March.
 18 April – The Auckland Exhibition closes.
 4 August – New Zealand declares war on Germany.
 29 August – 1374 New Zealand troops land in Samoa and are offered no resistance by German colonial forces. This is the second German territory (after Togoland) to be captured by the Allies.
 25 September – The departure of the New Zealand Expeditionary Force (NZEF) for Europe is delayed due to concerns about the presence of German raiders.
 16 October – The main body of the NZEF, some 8000 troops, finally departs New Zealand for Australia where they will join with the First AIF.
 1 November – The 38 ships carrying the NZEF (10 ships) and the AIF (28 ships) leave Perth, Western Australia. Although expecting to sail to England, they will receive orders to land in Egypt while crossing the Indian Ocean.
 Early December – The NZEF and AIF land in Egypt.
 10 December – The 1914 general election is held.

Arts and literature

See 1914 in art, 1914 in literature, :Category:1914 books

Music

See: 1914 in music

Film

Hinemoa, the first feature film made in New Zealand, premieres at the Lyric Theatre, Auckland.

Sport

Chess
 The 27th New Zealand Chess Championship is held in Auckland, and is won by W.E. Mason of Wellington, his fifth title.

Golf
 The eighth New Zealand Open championship is won by Ted Douglas (his second consecutive victory).
 The 22nd National Amateur Championships are held in Auckland:
 Men – Arthur Duncan (Wellington) (eighth title)
 Women – Mrs G. Williams (second title)

Horse racing

Harness racing
 New Zealand Trotting Cup – Win Soon
 Auckland Trotting Cup –  Steel Bell

Thoroughbred racing
 New Zealand Cup – Warstep
 Auckland Cup – Warstep
 Wellington Cup – Kilrain
 New Zealand Derby – Balboa

Lawn bowls
The national outdoor lawn bowls championships are held in Dunedin.
 Men's singles champion – J.S. Kilgour (Carlton Bowling Club)
 Men's pair champions – J. Johnson, E. Harraway (skip) (Dunedin Bowling Club)
 Men's fours champions – W. Grenfell, A.E. Erksine, W.J. Thompson, J. Porteous (skip) (Wellington Bowling Club)

Rugby league
 During the 1914 Great Britain Lions tour of Australia and New Zealand, the Kiwis lose to Great Britain 16–13 in Auckland

Rugby union

Soccer
 Provincial league champions:
 Auckland – Auckland Thistle
 Canterbury – Sydenham
 Hawke's Bay – Waipukurau
 Otago – Northern
 Southland – Rangers
 Wanganui – Eastbrooke
 Wellington – Wellington Corinthians

Tennis
 Anthony Wilding, partnered with Norman Brookes, wins the men's doubles at the Wimbledon Championship.
 The Davis Cup final is held in New York City. New Zealander Anthony Wilding and Australian Norman Brookes (playing as Australia rather than Australasia) beat the United States 3–2.

Births

January–March
 12 January – 
 Roy Jack, politician
 Everard Jackson, rugby union player
 22 January – Ron McLean, environmental campaigner
 30 January –  Bill Phillips, rugby union player
 1 February – James Gould, rower
 2 February – F. Russell Miller, politician
 3 February – Felix Kelly, graphic designer, painter, illustrator
 14 February – Jack Rankin, rugby union player
 19 February – Thelma Kench, athlete
 22 February – Theo Allen, athlete
 7 March – Doreen Blumhardt, potter, arts educator
 11 March – Dan Riddiford, politician
 16 March – H. W. Gretton, poet, lyricist, diarist
 19 March – Jack Best, rugby union player
 24 March
 Nancy Borlase, painter and art critic
 Enid McElwee, fencer
 27 March – Ces Burke, cricketer
 31 March – David Seath, politician

April–June
 2 April – Walter Whittlestone, dairy scientist, peace activist
 30 April – Zena Daysh, human ecologist
 5 May – Lloyd Trigg, World War II pilot, Victoria Cross recipient
 8 May – 
 Gaven Donne, jurist
 Dean Eyre, politician, diplomat
 27 May – Graham Turbott, ornithologist, zoologist, museum director
 30 May – Frank Sharpley, athlete
 2 June – Joe Genet, wrestler
 3 June –
 Tommy Farnan, association football player
 Reg Grant, World War II pilot
 13 June – Gordon Patrick, cyclist
 16 June – Theo de Lange, air force officer
 20 June – Pearl Savin, cricketer
 23 June – Clifford Richmond, jurist

July–September
 4 July – Ray Speed, association football player
 5 July – Jim Watt, rugby union player and paediatrician
 9 July – M. K. Joseph, poet and novelist
 28 July – 
 Wiremu Te Āwhitu, first Māori Roman Catholic priest
 Joey Sadler, rugby union player
 7 August – Alice Bush, doctor, family planning activist
 11 August – Donald Cobden, rugby union player, Battle of Britain pilot
 21 August – Billie Fulford, cricketer
 23 August – Jack Hemi, rugby union and rugby league player
 27 August –
 Gordon Christie, politician
 Vernon Thomas, wrestler
 2 September – Ron Barclay, politician

October–December
 13 October – Cecil Matthews, athlete
 17 October – Leo Schultz, politician
 22 October – Pat Boot, athlete
 23 October – Donald Stott, soldier, military intelligence agent
 30 October – Pat Mackie, miner and trade unionist
 7 November – Doug Freeman, cricketer
 8 November – Guthrie Wilson, novelist and teacher
 9 November – Colin Gray, World War II fighter ace
 15 November – Jack Holloway, alpine explorer, forest ecologist
 18 November – Bill Phillips, economist
 1 December – Peter Mathieson, swimmer
 4 December – Arthur Prior, logician and philosopher
 10 December – Reginald Delargey, Roman Catholic bishop
 21 December – Lankford Smith, association football player and cricketer
 22 December – Adrian Hayter, soldier, sailor, Antarctic leader, author
 25 December –
 James Fletcher, industrialist
 Don McRae, cricketer and association football player
 Bob White, politician
 27 December – Hilda Buck, cricketer
 28 December – Norman King, politician
 30 December – Ian Lythgoe, public servant

Deaths

January–June
 10 January – Samuel Hodgkinson, politician (born 1817)
 2 February – Alfred Burton, photographer (born 1834)
 8 February – Irving Sayles, vaudeville entertainer (born 1872)
 25 February – John Scott, medical academic, artist (born 1851)
 28 February – Ann Boyce, herbalist (born 1827)
 2 March – Mohi Tūrei, Ngāti Porou leader, Anglican minister, carver, haka composer (born 1830)
 18 March – Edwin Blake, politician (born 1830)
 20 March – Henry Goulstone, banker, magistrate (born 1836)
 10 June – Carbine, Thoroughbred racehorse (foaled 1885)

July–December
 6 July – Charles Carter, Baptist missionary (born 1828)
 21 July – John Blair Whyte, politician (born 1840)
 30 July – Helen Gibb, farmer, accommodation-house keeper (born 1838)
 16 August – Caroline Freeman, school teacher (born 1856)
 18 August – Thomas Young Duncan, politician (born 1836)
 25 August – 
 William McLean, politician, New Zealand's first motor car owner (born 1845)
 Patrick O'Reilly, Roman Catholic priest, educationalist (born 1843)
 2 September – John Carruthers, civil engineer, economic theorist (born 1836)
 29 September – Thomas Fergus, politician (born 1850)
 Maria Atkinson, community leader (born 1824)
 Matthew Green, politician (born 1840)
 1 October – Richard Barcham Shalders, Baptist preacher, founder of YMCA in New Zealand (born 1824)
 14 October – Walter Symes, politician (born 1852)
 17 October – Kennedy Macdonald, politician (born 1847)
 25 November – John Blair, businessman, politician, educational administrator (born 1843)
 30 November – John Shand, university professor (born 1834)
 21 December – William Montgomery, politician (born 1821)
 25 December – James Gow Black, chemist, mineralogist (born 1835)

Full date unknown
 Matutaera Nihoniho, a Ngāti Porou leader, soldier, storekeeper and assessor (born 1850)

See also
 List of years in New Zealand
 Timeline of New Zealand history
 History of New Zealand
 Military history of New Zealand
 Timeline of the New Zealand environment
 Timeline of New Zealand's links with Antarctica

References

External links